Real Confessions formerly known as Star Confessions, is a Philippine drama anthology television series hosted by Cristy Fermin and aired on TV5 every Saturday after Regal Shocker.

It features life stories of ordinary Filipino's, same format as Maalaala Mo Kaya from the rival network on ABS-CBN except of the one-on-one interview of the story holder with Cristy Fermin. It was formerly known as Star Confessions which features life stories of local celebrities. It premiered on November 5, 2011 with the episode "Sulat sa Langit" starring Gelli de Belen and Wendell Ramos.

The show recently won the Best Theme Song Award on the  2011 Asian TV Awards for its themesong Ito Ang Buhay Ko composed by Boy Christopher Ramos.

List of episodes

Awards and nominations
Best Theme Song award for its song "Ito Ang Buhay Ko" (2011 Asian TV Awards)

See also
List of programs broadcast by TV5

References

2011 Philippine television series debuts
2012 Philippine television series endings
TV5 (Philippine TV network) original programming
Philippine anthology television series
Philippine drama television series
Filipino-language television shows